Culex (Lophoceraomyia) rubithoracis is a species of mosquito belonging to the genus Culex. It is found in Cambodia, China, Guam, Hong Kong, India, Indonesia, Japan, Malaysia, Myanmar, Philippines, Java, Macau, Singapore, Sri Lanka, Thailand, Taiwan and Vietnam.

References

External links 
Urbanization and its effects on the ecology of mosquitoes in Macau, Southeast Asia.

rubithoracis
Insects described in 1908